Critters 4 is a 1992 American science fiction comedy horror film starring Don Keith Opper, Terrence Mann, Angela Bassett and Brad Dourif. It is the fourth installment in the Critters franchise, filmed simultaneously with part three, from February to July 1991. Unlike the first three films, this installment adopts a darker, less-comedic tone, and takes place not on Earth, but on a space station in the year 2045.

Plot 
The film begins where the previous film left off, as Charlie McFadden (Don Keith Opper) still in his role as an alien bounty hunter, is about to destroy two Critter eggs. He is suddenly stopped by a hologram message from his alien friend Ug (Terrence Mann), who tells him the eggs are the last two Critters in existence and that it is against an intergalactic law to cause their extinction. Charlie protests that the Critters are too dangerous to keep alive, but he obeys Ug's orders to place the eggs in a preservation capsule that suddenly falls from the sky. As Charlie puts the eggs in the pod, the hatch closes on him and he is launched into space.

Over a half-century later, in 2045, the crew of the salvage ship RSS Tesla finds the pod in deep space and bring it aboard. The ship is crewed by the shady and lecherous Captain Rick Buttram (Anders Hove); along with his eccentric engineer Al "Albert" Bert (Brad Dourif); pilot Fran (Angela Bassett); cargo specialist Bernie (Eric Da Re); and young engineer apprentice Ethan (Paul Whitthorne), who anxiously anticipates seeing his father back on Earth. While Rick and Bernie bully Ethan, Fran and Albert show him more appreciation.

After examining the pod, Ethan discovers the emblem of the old Intergalactic Council on the side and questions the legality of claiming it for salvage. After reporting their find, the ship gets a communication from Councilor Tetra (Terrence Mann), of TerraCor, who offers Rick three times the going rate if he brings the pod to a nearby station. Fran, Bernie and Albert encourage Rick to accept the deal, but Ethan disputes going off course as it will delay his trip home.

Eventually, the crew decides to go to the station, but find the facility abandoned and barely kept running by a malfunctioning central computer named "Angela" that will not obey orders unless given the exact opposite instruction. Matters are more problematic when Albert learns the reactor is leaking radiation although he does not anticipate it becoming critical for a month or so. Rick has bigger plans and secretly decides to rip off the others and take the contents of the pod for himself.

Eventually, Ethan stumbles upon Rick tampering with the pod, and Rick offers to cut him into his scheme saying his plan will get them back to Earth sooner. When Ethan refuses to abandon the others, Rick knocks him unconscious with a fire extinguisher. Rick manages to open the pod and encounters an excited Charlie who quickly jumps out. Infuriated, Rick refuses to believe Charlie is the only thing in the pod and crawls inside for himself. There, he discovers the freshly hatched baby Critters who quickly attack and kill him.

Charlie tries to shoot the Critters with Rick's gun but the critters manage to run off. He then revives Ethan and goes off to pursue the Critters with the confused boy in tow. Eventually, they meet up with the rest of the crew and Charlie explains who he is and how he came to be in the pod. While the crew contemplates his wild story, Bernie departs refusing to believe that "man-eating furballs" are running loose on the station.

Ethan then uses a computer keycard he earlier found outside a research lab to access a report made by Dr. McCormick (Anne Ramsay), who reveals that she was conducting research on various alien organisms for use as a bioweapon. Her creations however could not reproduce on their own and she requested finding a suitable organism capable of rapid reproduction. After realizing what has been going on aboard the station, Albert strongly suggests they all leave it immediately.

Meanwhile, Bernie sneaks into the station's pharmacy to steal drugs. The Critters sneak up on him and he becomes their next meal. After the others find his remains, Angela announces that the reactor will go critical within hours and starts sealing off sections of the station. Albert realizes the reactor was in far worse shape than he originally thought. The crew are then forced to crawl through tight service tunnels to reach their ship, during which they find a clutch of freshly laid Critter eggs and learn the Critters are breeding.

Unknown to the crew, the Critters have made their way to the Tesla and program the ship to head for the nearest inhabited planet – Earth. One Critter tells the other to "get the kids" while it preps the ship for take-off. Once the crew arrive, Albert hands Charlie the only weapon he has; an antique Colt revolver. Charlie wastes no time using it when they encounter the Critters on the ship, but his shots not only kill the Critters, but destroys the flight controls leaving the ship dead in the water.

While the crew attempt repairs, Ethan takes the gun to hunt down the last Critter himself. He finds the creature in the science lab using the equipment there to rapidly grow several baby Critters to full size. He then runs back to the ship to warn the others just as a Terracor ship carrying Tetra and his troopers arrives.

The surviving crew rush to meet Tetra, but finds the troopers pointing their weapons at them. Tetra demands the Critter eggs but Albert refuses to be threatened. Ethan arrives just as Tetra shoots and kills Albert. Tetra then knocks Fran to the deck while Charlie stands confounded that his old alien friend Ug has turned selfishly evil. Ug says "things change" and then orders his troops to go find the eggs.

Still unnoticed, Ethan runs back to the science lab and sets up a trap for Tetra's troopers. When they arrive he seals them inside with the pack of hungry critters. He then retrieves the Critter eggs from the tunnel and brings them back to Tetra while juggling them carelessly in the air. To Tetra's astonishment, Ethan purposely drops and breaks two of the eggs leaving one left. After Tetra threatens to kill Fran, Ethan tosses the last egg to distract him. Fran then notices the revolver hidden in Ethan's waistband and quickly strikes Tetra in the head with it, knocking him out.

Charlie and Fran then rush aboard Tetra's ship to prepare for take-off, but Ethan lingers to mourn over Albert's body. Suddenly, the last Critter appears and attacks him, but Ethan manages to flash freeze the Critter with a fuel hose. As Ethan recovers he finds Tetra pointing a gun at him. Charlie returns and points the revolver at Tetra who doubts that Charlie even has the guts to pull the trigger. Charlie utters, "Things change, Ug", and shoots Tetra in the head.

Angela then warns that the reactor will go critical in a matter of moments and the survivors rush aboard Tetra's ship to escape. As Angela counts down to detonation, the station suddenly explodes a few seconds early leaving Ethan to laugh at how stupid the computer was, and that it could not even correctly tell time.

With the critters now extinct, Charlie, Fran and Ethan depart on their continuing voyage to Earth and Charlie contemplates on how the future will look bright for him.

Cast 
 Don Keith Opper as Charlie McFadden
 Terrence Mann as Ug / Counselor Tetra
 Angela Bassett as Fran
 Brad Dourif as Al 'Albert' Bert
 Anne Ramsay as Dr. McCormick
 Paul Whitthorne as Ethan
 Anders Hove as Captain Rick Buttram
 Eric Da Re as Bernie
 Martine Beswick as the voice of Angela
 Jonas Brindley as Dr. Franky

Release 
Critters 4 was released on VHS on September 1, 1998, by New Line Home Entertainment. The film was released on DVD on September 13, 2005, by Warner Home Video. Critters 4 was re-released in a set containing all four Critters films on DVD September 7, 2010, by Warner Home Video.

Scream Factory, a subsidiary of Shout! Factory released the four films as part of "The Critters Collection" on Blu-ray. The set was released on November 27, 2018.

Web series 
Warner Bros. produced a reboot web series based on the Critters films. Critters: A New Binge premiered on Shudder on March 21, 2019.

References

External links 

 
 
 

1992 horror films
1992 films
1990s monster movies
1990s science fiction horror films
American comedy horror films
American monster movies
American science fiction horror films
American space adventure films
Direct-to-video sequel films
Puppet films
Films set in 1992
Films set in 2045
Films set in the future
Films shot in Los Angeles
Films set on spacecraft
New Line Cinema direct-to-video films
1992 directorial debut films
Critters (franchise)
1990s English-language films
1990s American films